Beaux is a French surname. Notable people with the surname include:

 Cecilia Beaux (1855–1942), American painter
 Ernest Beaux (1881–1961), Russian-born French perfumer

See also
 Beaux

French-language surnames